Metanephrine (metadrenaline) is a metabolite of epinephrine (adrenaline) created by action of catechol-O-methyl transferase on epinephrine. An article in the Journal of the American Medical Association, 2002, indicated that the measurement of plasma free levels of the metanephrines group of molecules (including metanephrine and normetanephrine) is the best tool in the diagnosis of pheochromocytoma, an adrenal medullary neoplasm.

References

Phenylethanolamines